The Hereford Museum and Art Gallery is a local museum in the cathedral city of Hereford, Herefordshire, England.

The museum is housed in a Victorian Gothic building. Through the generosity of James Rankin, President of the Woolhope Naturalists' Field Club, it was opened as a free library and museum on 8 October 1874 and has since exhibited artefacts, fine art, and decorative art associated with the local area.

Exhibitions 

There are regular temporary exhibitions of craftwork, paintings, photography, and prints.
In 2006, the bicentennial of Joseph Murray Ince was celebrated with an exhibition.

The designs of Christopher Dresser were exhibited in 2007.
An exhibition of work by the locally born artist Brian Hatton (1887–1916) was displayed at the gallery between November 2007 and January 2008.

Having closed temporarily for building repairs in September 2015, the Hereford Museum and Art Gallery re-opened for the summer months in July 2017. As of July 2017, exhibits in the museum include a two-headed calf, a two-metre long fish, various swords, elements of costume and textiles, as well as objects of historic, social and scientific interest dating back from the pre-historic era up to the 20th century. The gallery currently has over 80 works by Brian Hatton, as well as many of his materials and selected letters.

Accessibility 
In 2005, the museum became the first in the United Kingdom to invest in the Talking Tactile Tablet (T3), developed at the UK's Royal National College for the Blind in Hereford together with a software company based in the USA.

See also 
 List of museums in Herefordshire

References

External links 
 Hereford Museum and Art Gallery, Herefordshire Council

Art museums established in 1874
Museums in Herefordshire
Local museums in Herefordshire
Art museums and galleries in Herefordshire
Hereford
Buildings and structures in Hereford
Decorative arts museums in England
1874 establishments in England